Anton Pongratz ( Antal Pongrácz; 18 March 1948 – 18 March 2008) was a Romanian fencer and dentist. He competed in the individual and team épée events at the 1972, 1976 and 1980 Summer Olympics.

Life
Antal Pongrácz was born on 18 March 1948 in Marosvásárhely, one of the children of Roman Catholic parents: Antal Pongrácz, a mechanic and locksmith in a textile factory, and Margit Mikola. In 1973, he married. He and his  wife, Dr. Mária Pongrácz, had one child, István-Mátyás Pongrácz, who followed in his father's footsteps to become a dentist.

References

1948 births
2008 deaths
Romanian male fencers
Romanian épée fencers
Olympic fencers of Romania
Fencers at the 1972 Summer Olympics
Fencers at the 1976 Summer Olympics
Fencers at the 1980 Summer Olympics
Sportspeople from Târgu Mureș
20th-century dentists